Steven Hardwick (born 6 September 1956 in Mansfield) is a former professional footballer who played as a goalkeeper for 6 professional teams during the 1970s, 1980s & 1990s.

External links
 NASL Stats
 

1956 births
Living people
Footballers from Mansfield
English footballers
Association football goalkeepers
Chesterfield F.C. players
Newcastle United F.C. players
Oxford United F.C. players
Crystal Palace F.C. players
Sunderland A.F.C. players
Huddersfield Town A.F.C. players
English Football League players
North American Soccer League (1968–1984) players
Detroit Express players
English expatriate sportspeople in the United States
Expatriate soccer players in the United States
English expatriate footballers